Mt. Scott Park is an  public park in Portland, Oregon's Mt. Scott-Arleta neighborhood, in the United States. Named after Harvey W. Scott, the park was acquired in 1922 and houses the Mt. Scott Community Center.

Description and history
The park was the starting point for the World Naked Bike Ride in 2016.

Mt. Scott Community Center 

The Mt. Scott Community Center was built in 1927, and acquired by Portland Parks and Recreation in 1949.

The community center has served as a temporary homeless shelter.

References

External links

 

1922 establishments in Oregon
Mt. Scott-Arleta, Portland, Oregon
Parks in Portland, Oregon